Prakasam (ప్రకాశం) district is one of the thirteen districts in the coastal Andhra region of the Indian state of Andhra Pradesh. It was formed in 1970 and reorganised in 2022 on April 4. The headquarters of the district is Ongole. It is located on the western shore of Bay of Bengal and is bounded by Bapatla district and Palnadu districts on the north, Nandyal district on the west, Kadapa and Nellore districts on the south. A part of north west region also borders with Nagarkurnool district of Telangana.

Etymology 
The district was named after the patriot and first Chief Minister of Andhra State Tanguturi Prakasam, also known as Andhra Kesari, who was born in the village of Vinodarayunipalem. It was accordingly renamed as Prakasam District in the year 1972.

History 
Prakasam district was originally constituted on 2 February 1970, carved out of Guntur, Nellore and Kurnool districts of Andhra Pradesh. It was carved out of three taluks of Guntur district, i.e. Addanki, Chirala, and Ongole, four taluks of Nellore district, i.e. Kandukur, Kanigiri, Darsi and Podili and three taluks of Kurnool district i.e. Markapur, Yarragondapalem and Giddaluru. It is one of the nine districts in the Coastal Andhra region of Andhra Pradesh.

Prakasam district used to be a part of the Red Corridor.

Geography 

This district is bounded by Nagarkurnool district in Telangana state at North.And surrounded by South of SPSR Nellore district , West of Nandyal district ,East of Palnadu district and Bapatla district.And The Bay of Bengal held on Southeast of this district.

The only Municipal Corporation in Prakasam is Ongole. Some of the main towns in Prakasam district are Singarayakonda, Addanki, Inkollu, Markapur, Yerragondapalem, Podili, Darsi, Donakonda, Chirala, Kandukur, Pamuru, Parchur, Giddaluru, Dornala, Cumbum, Kanigiri, Chimakurthy and Martur. Markapur is India's main slate-manufacturing town and the home of the historic temple of Lord Chennakesava. Chimakurthi is known for its granite reserves. Dornala is also known as Diguva Srisailam, since it is very near the historic pilgrimage centre of Srisailam.

Cumbum lake also known as Gundalakamma lake built on Gundalakamma rivulet upon Nallamala hills is one of the oldest man made lakes of Asia. The anicut was built by the Vijayanagar princess Varadharaj Amma. Although classified under the Coastal Andhra region, the district's western half has Rayalaseema like geography and climate, being somewhat arid.

Demographics 

As of the 2011 census of India, the district had a population of 3,397,448 with a density of 193 persons per sq.km. The total population constitute, 17,14,764 males and 16,82,684 females –a ratio of 981 females per 1000 males. The total urban population is 664,582 (19.56%). There are 19,04,435 literates with a literacy rate of 63.08%.

After bifurcation the district had a population of 22,88,026, of which 444,865 (19.44%) lived in urban areas. Prakasam district had a sex ratio of 971 females per 1000 males. Scheduled Castes and Scheduled Tribes make up 537,159 (23.48%) and 88,209 (3.86%) of the population respectively.

At the time of the 2011 census, 93.88% of the population spoke Telugu and 5.05% Urdu as their first language.

Economy 

The major products contributing to the GVA of the district from agriculture and allied services are, tobacco, paddy, chillies, batavia, milk, meat and fisheries. The GVA to the industrial and service sector is contributed from construction, minor minerals, unorganised trade and ownership of dwellings.

Industries 
The district has many service industries such as industrial testing, electrical appliance repair, clinical laboratories, servicing of computer hardware, tourism, and hospitality. Major exports from the district include seafood, processed tobacco, granite blocks, granite monuments and yarn. There are many industries of food and agriculture, mineral, chemical, leather, plastic and rubber, engineering, cotton and textiles, electronic products. All these industries deal with prawn and fish processing and canning, dairy products, the granite industry, pharmaceuticals, tanning, fishing nets, surgical cotton, etc. Forest-based industries produce Ayurvedic medicines, essential oil (Palm Rose Oil), wooden furniture, wooden toys, bamboo products, etc.

Mining 

The district leads in granite mining in the state with discovery of Galaxy Granite in the Chimakurthy area of the district. Good deposits of coloured granites are located occur around Uppumaguluru and Kodidena. The minerals found in the district are Baryte, iron ore, quartz, and silica sand. In 2010-11, 4,300 tonnes of Baryte, 22,722 tonnes of quartz, 2,24,075 tonnes of silica sand and 400 tonnes of iron ore were produced.

Granite barons in Prakasam district sold ahead of the Beijing Olympics in 2008 as the natural stone material was widely used in the construction of the sports village. The famous Black Galaxy granite, Black pearl, Steal Grey and English Grey processed in the SEZ make it to, among other countries, the U.S., Canada, Germany, Netherlands, Italy, Poland, Turkey, Saudi Arabia, and Algeria. Processing of granite was insignificant in the district before 2010. But now after the setting up of 13 export oriented units within the SEZ and five elsewhere in the district, at least 60% of the decorative stone material is processed here. Over 500 to 600 containers of the material are shipped from the SEZ every month to other countries, the U.S. alone accounting for 20%.

Tourism 

The Bhairava Kona cave temples are 8th-century single rock-cut cave temples (similar to Mahabalipuram) for Lord Shiva.

Cumbum Tank is one of the oldest man-made lakes in Asia. The anicut was built by the Vijayanagar Princess Varadharajamma (also known as Ruchidevi), wife of Sri Krishna Devaraya. It has received World Heritage Irrigation Structure (WHIS) tag in the year 2020 by UNESCO.

Administrative divisions 

The District comprises three Revenue divisions viz., Ongole, Kanigiri and Markapur. 

38 Mandals. ‘1’ Municipal Corporation i.e., Ongole, ‘1’ Municipality i.e., Markapur and ‘5’ Nagarapanchayats Chimakurthy, Giddalur, Podili, Darsi and Kanigiri in the District.

Ongole division consists of ‘12’ mandals, Kanigiri division with ‘13’ mandals and Markapur division with ‘13’ mandals. Thus, a total of 38 mandals besides 1 Municipal Corporation, 1 Municipality, 5 Nagara Panchayats and 715 Gram Panchayats are existing in the district. ‘750’ Inhabited Revenue villages are existing in the district. They have been constituted into 734 Gram Panchayats.

Mandals 

The list of 39 mandals in Prakasam district under three revenue divisions are listed in the following table:

Parliament segments

Ongole (Lok Sabha constituency), Bapatla (Lok Sabha constituency)

Assembly segments
Ongole and Bapatla Lok Sabha constituency presently comprises the following Legislative Assembly segments:

Erstwhile Talukas in Prakasam district 
In 1978, the number of talukas in Prakasam was increased from 9 to 17. Later in 1985, 17 Talukas were divided into 56 mandals.

Towns in Prakasam District 

 Vetapalem is included in Chirala town's population.

Transport 

The district is well connected by National highways, state highways and district roads as well. The NH 16 passes through Ongole which is the major highway connecting Howrah – Chennai, a part of Asian Highway Network AH45. APSRTC, a state government public bus transport operates services.

The entire rail network is under South Central Railway zone.  is one of the main stations of this district and most of the stations are under Vijayawada railway division.

Minister of State for Civil Aviation, has granted site clearance for setting up of a Greenfield Airport at Ongole.

Notable personalities 
There are many noted people from the district including Tanguturi Prakasam, a freedom fighter who was also the Chief Minister of Andhra State and Chief Minister of Madras Presidency. Mirza Ghouse Baig, M.A.LL.B Retired District Judge a second world war veteran who led the mutiny against the Britishers at Ambala Cantt.  U. Aswathanarayana who was a Director of the Mahadevan International Centre for Water Resources Management in India. From the film industry personalities include Bhanumathi Ramakrishna was a film actress who was also a producer, director and singer. D. Ramanaidu, film producer; Tottempudi Krishna, film director and editor; Giri Babu, film actor; Raghu Babu, film actor and comedian in Telugu cinema; Dharmavarapu Subramanyam, comedian in Telugu cinema. Pullela Gopichand, an all-england champion and national badminton coach; Yarlagadda Nayudamma is a consultant paediatric surgeon. He is the only Indian surgeon to have successfully separated three sets of Conjoined Twins fused at three different locations – head, thorax-abdomen and pelvis; Former HRD Minister in the UPA 2 government Daggubati Purandeswari daughter of N. T. Rama Rao and is married to Daggubati Venkateswara Rao, GVL Narsimha Rao are nationally visible faces from the villages in the district. Artists family of Thimmiri Narasimharao,( Thimmiri naresh babu, (tollywood art director) thimmiri raveendra(secretary of srusti art academy) thimmiri bhanuchandar (artist), battula vani ( drawing teacher).

Education 
The primary and secondary school education is imparted by government, aided and private schools, under the state's School Education Department. As per the school information report for the academic year 2015–16, there are a total of 4,311 schools. They include, 33 government, 2,949 mandal and zilla parishads, 1 residential, 1079 private, 10 model, 37 Kasturba Gandhi Balika Vidyalaya (KGBV), 50 municipal and 152 other types of schools. The total number of students enrolled in primary, upper primary and high schools of the district are 562,510. The total number of students enrolled in primary, upper primary and high schools of the district are 461,065.

References

External links 

 Official site

 
Districts of Andhra Pradesh
1970 establishments in Andhra Pradesh